In geometry, a truncated icosidodecahedron, rhombitruncated icosidodecahedron, great rhombicosidodecahedron, omnitruncated dodecahedron or omnitruncated icosahedron is an Archimedean solid, one of thirteen convex, isogonal, non-prismatic solids constructed by two or more types of regular polygon faces.

It has 62 faces: 30 squares, 20 regular hexagons, and 12 regular decagons. It has the most edges and vertices of all Platonic and Archimedean solids, though the snub dodecahedron has more faces. Of all vertex-transitive polyhedra, it occupies the largest percentage (89.80%) of the volume of a sphere in which it is inscribed, very narrowly beating the snub dodecahedron (89.63%) and small rhombicosidodecahedron (89.23%), and less narrowly beating the truncated icosahedron (86.74%); it also has by far the greatest volume (206.8 cubic units) when its edge length equals 1. Of all vertex-transitive polyhedra that are not prisms or antiprisms, it has the largest sum of angles (90 + 120 + 144 = 354 degrees) at each vertex; only a prism or antiprism with more than 60 sides would have a larger sum. Since each of its faces has point symmetry (equivalently, 180° rotational symmetry), the truncated icosidodecahedron is a 15-zonohedron.

Names

The name great rhombicosidodecahedron refers to the relationship with the (small) rhombicosidodecahedron (compare section Dissection).
There is a nonconvex uniform polyhedron with a similar name, the nonconvex great rhombicosidodecahedron.

Area and volume
The surface area A and the volume V of the truncated icosidodecahedron of edge length a are:

 

If a set of all 13 Archimedean solids were constructed with all edge lengths equal, the truncated icosidodecahedron would be the largest.

Cartesian coordinates
Cartesian coordinates for the vertices of a truncated icosidodecahedron with edge length 2φ − 2, centered at the origin, are all the even permutations of:
(±, ±, ±(3 + φ)),
(±, ±φ, ±(1 + 2φ)),
(±, ±φ2, ±(−1 + 3φ)),
(±(2φ − 1), ±2, ±(2 + φ)) and
(±φ, ±3, ±2φ),
where φ =  is the golden ratio.

Dissection 

The rest of its space can be dissected into nonuniform cupolas, namely 12 between inner pentagons and outer decagons and 20 between inner triangles and outer hexagons.

An alternative dissection also has a rhombicosidodecahedral core. It has 12 pentagonal rotundae between inner pentagons and outer decagons. The remaining part is a toroidal polyhedron.

Orthogonal projections
The truncated icosidodecahedron has seven special orthogonal projections, centered on a vertex, on three types of edges, and three types of faces: square, hexagonal and decagonal. The last two correspond to the A2 and H2 Coxeter planes.

Spherical tilings and Schlegel diagrams 
The truncated icosidodecahedron can also be represented as a spherical tiling, and projected onto the plane via a stereographic projection. This projection is conformal, preserving angles but not areas or lengths. Straight lines on the sphere are projected as circular arcs on the plane.

Schlegel diagrams are similar, with a perspective projection and straight edges.

Geometric variations 
Within Icosahedral symmetry there are unlimited geometric variations of the truncated icosidodecahedron with isogonal faces. The truncated dodecahedron, rhombicosidodecahedron, and truncated icosahedron as degenerate limiting cases.

Truncated icosidodecahedral graph 

In the mathematical field of graph theory, a truncated icosidodecahedral graph (or great rhombicosidodecahedral graph) is the graph of vertices and edges of the truncated icosidodecahedron, one of the Archimedean solids. It has 120 vertices and 180 edges, and is a zero-symmetric and cubic Archimedean graph.

Related polyhedra and tilings

This polyhedron can be considered a member of a sequence of uniform patterns with vertex figure (4.6.2p) and Coxeter-Dynkin diagram .  For p < 6, the members of the sequence are omnitruncated polyhedra (zonohedrons), shown below as spherical tilings. For p > 6, they are tilings of the hyperbolic plane, starting with the truncated triheptagonal tiling.

Notes

References

Cromwell, P.; Polyhedra, CUP hbk (1997), pbk. (1999).

External links
 
 * 
Editable printable net of a truncated icosidodecahedron with interactive 3D view
The Uniform Polyhedra
Virtual Reality Polyhedra The Encyclopedia of Polyhedra

Uniform polyhedra
Archimedean solids
Truncated tilings
Zonohedra
Individual graphs
Planar graphs